Irina Kuznetsova can refer to:
 Irina Davydovna Kuznetsova (born 1923), Soviet-Latvian politician
 Irina Levshakova (née Kuznetsova) (1959–2016), Soviet/Russian paleontologist and artist